"Burned With Desire" is a song by Dutch disc jockey and producer Armin van Buuren. It features vocals from British singer and songwriter Justine Suissa. It was released as 12" vinyl and CD single in the US on November 2003 by Ultra Records and in the Netherlands on 18 March 2004 by United Recordings. It is the fourth single from van Buuren's first studio album, 76.

Critical review 
Maria Clinton from EDM Identity declares the song "Sounds super depressing but this is what I love most about a great vocal anthem. It gets people feeling something. Good or bad. It doesn’t matter. Magic begins to sweep across the dance floor when the sound of Justine Suissa’s voice floats effortlessly through the airwaves."

Music video 
A music video to accompany the release of "Burned With Desire" was realised in 2004. It shows dancers in front of van Buuren performing the song.

Track listing 
US – 12" – Ultra 
 "Burned With Desire" (Rising Star Remix) – 8:37
 "Burned With Desire" (Rising Star Dub) – 7:51
 "Burned With Desire" (Album Version) – 5:50

US – CD single – Ultra
 "Burned With Desire" (Rising Star Edit) – 3:30
 "Burned With Desire" (Rising Star Remix) – 8:35
 "Burned With Desire" (Ronski Speed Remix) – 9:21

Netherlands – CD single – United 
 "Burned With Desire" (Rising Star Edit) – 2:59
 "Burned With Desire" (Rising Star Vocal Mix) – 8:35

UK – 12" single – Nebula 
 "Burned With Desire" (Rising Star Vocal Mix) – 8:35
 "Burned With Desire" (Riley & Durrant Vocal Mix) – 9:53

UK – CD single – Nebula 
 "Burned With Desire" (Rising Star Radio Edit) – 3:01
 "Burned With Desire" (Riley & Durrant Radio Edit) – 3:36

UK –  Digital download / CD Single – Nebula 
 "Burned With Desire" (Rising Star Edit) – 3:01
 "Burned With Desire" (Rising Star Vocal Mix) – 8:37
 "Burned With Desire" (Rising Star Dub Mix)  – 7:53
 "Burned With Desire" (Riley & Durrant Vocal Remix) – 9:53
 "Burned With Desire" (Ronski Speed Dub Mix) – 6:58

Dub Mixes – UK – 12" – Nebula 
 "Burned With Desire" (Rising Star Dub Mix) – 6:58
 "Burned With Desire" (Riley & Durrant Dub Mix) – 9:01

US – Digital download – Ultra 
 "Burned With Desire" (Radio Edit) – 3:28
 "Burned With Desire" (UK Radio Edit) – 3:01
 "Burned With Desire" (Album Version) – 5:56
 "Burned With Desire" (Rising Star Radio Edit) – 3:28
 "Burned With Desire" (Rising Star Remix) – 8:36
 "Burned With Desire" (Rising Star Dub) – 7:52
 "Burned With Desire" (Ronski Speed Radio Edit) – 3:51
 "Burned With Desire" (Ronski Speed Remix) – 9:21
 "Burned With Desire" (Ronski Speed Short Dub) – 5:55
 "Burned With Desire" (Ronski Speed Dub) – 6:55
 "Burned With Desire" (Riley & Durrant Vocal Remix) – 9:56
 "Burned With Desire" (Riley & Durrant Dub) – 9:01
 "Burned With Desire" (Kyau vs. Albert Remix) – 7:41
 "Burned With Desire" (Brian Cross Remix) – 5:31
 "Burned With Desire" (Chill Out Mix) – 7:02

LTN Sunrise Remix – Netherlands – Digital download – Armind 
 "Burned With Desire" (LTN Extended Sunrise Remix) – 4:48

Charts

Chase Masterson version 

American actress and singer Chase Masterson performed a cover of "Burned With Desire" for an early cut of the motion picture Yesterday Was a Lie, but the song was not included in the commercial release of the film. Masterson's recording was released as a single on 17 October 2012.

Critical review 
Rory L. Aronsky of Film Threat praised the recording, saying it "propels Masterson's voice from sultry chanteuse to haunting spirit. Besides her voice, Masterson is also blessed with lyrics that actually mean something, about human desire and how sometimes it can be painfully unreciprocated. It's a song with endless repeat value."

References

2003 songs
2003 singles
Armin van Buuren songs
Songs written by Armin van Buuren
Songs written by Justine Suissa
2012 songs
2012 singles
American pop songs